Liebeck v. McDonald's Restaurants, also known as the McDonald's coffee case and the hot coffee lawsuit, was a highly publicized 1994 product liability lawsuit in the United States against the McDonald's restaurant chain.

The plaintiff, Stella Liebeck (1912–2004), a 79-year-old woman, suffered third-degree burns in her pelvic region when she accidentally spilled coffee in her lap after purchasing it from a McDonald's restaurant. She was hospitalized for eight days while undergoing skin grafting, followed by two years of medical treatment. Liebeck sought to settle with McDonald's for $20,000 to cover her medical expenses. When McDonald's refused, Liebeck's attorney filed suit in the U.S. District Court for the District of New Mexico, accusing McDonald's of gross negligence.

The jury found that McDonald's was 80 percent responsible for the incident. They awarded Liebeck a net $160,000 in compensatory damages to cover medical expenses, and $2.7 million in punitive damages, the equivalent of two days of McDonald's coffee sales. The trial judge reduced the punitive damages to three times the amount of the compensatory damages, totalling $640,000. The parties settled for a confidential amount before an appeal was decided.

The Liebeck case became a flashpoint in the debate in the United States over tort reform.  It was cited by some as an example of frivolous litigation; ABC News called the case "the poster child of excessive lawsuits", while the legal scholar Jonathan Turley argued that the claim was "a meaningful and worthy lawsuit". Ex-attorney Susan Saladoff sees the portrayal in the media as purposeful misrepresentation due to political and corporate influence. In June 2011, HBO premiered Hot Coffee, a documentary that discussed in depth how the Liebeck case has centered in debates on tort reform.

Burn incident
Stella May Liebeck was born in Norwich, England, on December 14, 1912; she was 79 at the time of the burn incident. On February 27, 1992, Liebeck ordered a 49-cent cup of coffee from the drive-through window of an Albuquerque McDonald's restaurant at 5001 Gibson Boulevard Southeast. Liebeck was in the passenger's seat of a 1989 Ford Probe, which did not have cup holders. Her nephew parked the car so that Liebeck could add cream and sugar to her coffee. Liebeck placed the coffee cup between her knees and pulled the far side of the lid toward her to remove it. In the process, she spilled the entire cup of coffee on her lap. Liebeck was wearing cotton sweatpants; they absorbed the coffee and held it against her skin, scalding her thighs, buttocks, and groin.

Liebeck went into shock and was taken to an emergency room at a hospital, where it was determined that she had suffered third-degree burns on six percent of her skin and lesser burns over sixteen percent. She remained in the hospital for eight days while she underwent skin grafting. After the hospital stay, Liebeck needed care for three weeks, which was provided by her daughter. Liebeck suffered permanent disfigurement after the incident and was partially disabled for two years.

Attempts to settle 
Liebeck sought to settle with McDonald's for $20,000 to cover her actual and anticipated expenses. Her past medical expenses were $10,500; her anticipated future medical expenses were approximately $2,500; and her daughter's loss of income was approximately $5,000 for a total of approximately $18,000. Instead, the company offered only $800.

When McDonald's refused to raise its offer, Liebeck retained Texas attorney Reed Morgan. Morgan filed suit in the U.S. District Court for the District of New Mexico, accusing McDonald's of gross negligence for selling coffee that was "unreasonably dangerous" and "defectively manufactured". McDonald's refused Morgan's offer to settle for $90,000. Morgan offered to settle for $300,000, and a mediator suggested $225,000 just before trial; McDonald's refused both.

Trial
The Liebeck case trial took place from August 8 to 17, 1994, before New Mexico District Court Judge Robert H. Scott. The attorneys presented evidence that coffee they had tested all over the city was served at a temperature at least 20 °F (11 °C) lower than McDonald's coffee. They also presented the jury with expert testimony that  coffee may produce third-degree burns (where skin grafting is necessary) in about three seconds and  coffee may produce such burns in about twelve to fifteen seconds. Lowering the temperature to  would increase the time for the coffee to produce such a burn to 20 seconds. Liebeck's attorneys argued that these extra seconds could provide adequate time to remove the coffee from exposed skin, thereby preventing many burns.

McDonald's claimed that the reason for serving such hot coffee in its drive-through windows was that those who purchased the coffee typically were commuters who wanted to drive a distance with the coffee; the high initial temperature would keep the coffee hot during the trip. However, it came to light that McDonald's had carried out research finding that customers intend to consume the coffee immediately while driving.

Other documents obtained from McDonald's showed that from 1982 to 1992 the company had received more than 700 reports of people burned by McDonald's coffee to varying degrees of severity, and had settled claims arising from scalding injuries for more than $500,000. McDonald's quality control manager, Christopher Appleton, testified that this number of injuries was insufficient to cause the company to evaluate its practices. He argued that all foods hotter than  constituted a burn hazard, and that restaurants had more pressing dangers to worry about. The plaintiffs argued that Appleton conceded that McDonald's coffee would burn the mouth and throat if consumed when served.

Verdict 
A twelve-person jury reached its verdict on August 18, 1994.  Applying the principles of comparative negligence, the jury found that McDonald's was 80 percent responsible for the incident and Liebeck was 20 percent at fault. Though there was a warning on the coffee cup, the jury decided that the warning was neither large enough nor sufficient. They awarded Liebeck $200,000 in compensatory damages, which was reduced by 20 percent to $160,000. In addition, they awarded her $2.7 million in punitive damages. According to The New York Times, the jurors arrived at this figure from Morgan's suggestion to penalize McDonald's for two days of coffee revenues, about $1.35 million per day.

The judge reduced punitive damages to $480,000, three times the compensatory amount, for a total of $640,000. The decision was appealed by both McDonald's and Liebeck in December 1994, but the parties settled out of court for an undisclosed amount. The Albuquerque Journal ran the first story of the verdict, followed by the Associated Press wire, which was picked up by newspapers around the world.

Aftermath
The Liebeck case is cited by some as an example of frivolous litigation. ABC News called the case "the poster child of excessive lawsuits". Legal commentator Jonathan Turley called it "a meaningful and worthy lawsuit". McDonald's asserts that the outcome of the case was a fluke, and attributed the loss to poor communications and strategy by an unfamiliar insurer representing a franchise. Liebeck's attorney, Reed Morgan, and the Association of Trial Lawyers of America defended the result in Liebeck by claiming that McDonald's reduced the temperature of its coffee after the suit, although it is not clear whether McDonald's in fact had done so.

Detractors have argued that McDonald's refusal to offer more than an $800 settlement for the $10,500 in medical bills indicated that the suit was meritless and highlighted the fact that Liebeck spilled the coffee on herself rather than any wrongdoing on the company's part. They state that the vast majority of judges who consider similar cases dismiss them before they get to a jury.

Liebeck died on August 5, 2004, at age 91. According to her daughter, "the burns and court proceedings (had taken) their toll" and in the years following the settlement Liebeck had "no quality of life". She said the settlement had paid for a live-in nurse.

Similar lawsuits
In McMahon v. Bunn Matic Corporation (1998), Seventh Circuit Court of Appeals Judge Frank Easterbrook wrote a unanimous opinion affirming dismissal of a similar lawsuit against coffeemaker manufacturer Bunn-O-Matic, finding that  hot coffee was not "unreasonably dangerous".

In Bogle v. McDonald's Restaurants Ltd. (2002), a similar lawsuit in the United Kingdom failed when the court rejected the claim that McDonald's could have avoided injury by serving coffee at a lower temperature.

Since Liebeck, major vendors of coffee, including Chick-Fil-A, Starbucks, Dunkin' Donuts, Wendy's, Burger King, hospitals, and McDonald's have been defendants in similar lawsuits over coffee-related burns.  There have also been lawsuits over injuries from other hot liquids.

Two years prior to Liebeck, a similar lawsuit was settled during the trial for $15 million due to injuries from a sink in a rented apartment.

Coffee temperature
Since Liebeck, McDonald's has not reduced the service temperature of its coffee. The Specialty Coffee Association of America supports improved packaging methods rather than lowering the temperature at which coffee is served. The association has successfully aided the defense of subsequent coffee burn cases.

Hot Coffee documentary

On June 27, 2011, HBO premiered a documentary about tort reform problems titled Hot Coffee. A large portion of the film covered Liebeck's lawsuit. This included news clips, comments from celebrities and politicians about the case, as well as myths and misconceptions, including how many people thought she was driving when the incident occurred and thought that she suffered only minor superficial burns.

The New York Times Retro Report
On October 21, 2013, The New York Times published a Retro Report video about the media reaction and an accompanying article about the changes in coffee drinking over 20 years. The New York Times noted how the details of Liebeck's story lost length and context as it was reported worldwide. McDonald's rather than Liebeck was portrayed as the victim.

An October 25 follow-up article noted that the video had more than one million views and had sparked vigorous debate in the online comments.

See also
 McDonald's legal cases
 Compensation culture
 "The Postponement" and "The Maestro", Seinfeld episodes which include a parody of the case

References

Footnotes

Bibliography

Further reading

External links
The Stella Liebeck McDonald's Hot Coffee Case FAQ  at Abnormal Use
The Full Story Behind the Case and How Corporations Used it to Promote Tort Reform? – video report by Democracy Now!
Thought the McDonald's Hot Coffee Spilling Lawsuit was Frivolous? by David Haynes of The Cochran Firm
Case Study: The True Story Behind the McDonald's Coffee Lawsuit 
American Museum of Tort Law, Liebeck v. McDonald’s: The Hot Coffee Case
Consumer Attorneys of California, The McDonald’s Hot Coffee Case

McDonald's litigation
New Mexico state case law
United States tort case law
1994 in United States case law
1994 in New Mexico
Food safety in the United States
Coffee preparation
History of Albuquerque, New Mexico